Myawaddy Township (Phlone) is a township of Myawaddy District in the Kayin State of Burma (Myanmar). It is the only township in Myawaddy District. The administrative seat is the town of Myawaddy.

Boundaries
Myawaddy Township borders on:
 Kyain Seikgyi Township of Kawkareik District to the southwest and west,
 Kawkareik Township of Kawkareik District to the west,
 Hlaingbwe Township of Hpa-an District to the northwest, and
 Thailand to the northeast, east and south.

Notes

External links
 "Myawaddy Township - Kayin State" map, 4 August 2010, Myanmar Information Management Unit (MIMU)
 "Myawadi Google Satellite Map" Maplandia World Gazetteer

Townships of Kayin State